KWLJ-LP is a religious formatted broadcast radio station licensed to and serving Moorhead, Minnesota. It is owned by Bible Truth Radio, Inc.

References

External links
 

2017 establishments in Minnesota
Radio stations established in 2017
Low-power FM radio stations in Minnesota
Christian radio stations in Minnesota
Moorhead, Minnesota